The 2016 USA Swimming Olympic trials were held for the third straight quadrennial at CenturyLink Center Omaha in Omaha, Nebraska from June 26 to July 3, 2016. Those qualifying competed for the United States in Swimming at the 2016 Summer Olympics in Rio de Janeiro, Brazil.

Qualification criteria

A maximum of 52 swimmers (26 of each sex, not including open water swimmers) were chosen for the 2016 Summer Olympics.  To make the Olympic team, a swimmer must place in the top two in one of the thirteen individual events.  To be considered for the U.S. 4×100-meter and 4×200-meter freestyle relay teams, a swimmer must place in the top six in the 100-meter and 200-meter freestyle, respectively.  Swimmers must have achieved a time standard to be eligible to compete in the U.S. Olympic trials:

 Information retrieved from USA Swimming.

Events
The meet featured twenty-six individual events all swam in a long course (50-meter) pool—thirteen events for men and thirteen events for women.  Events 200 meters and shorter were held with preliminaries, semifinals and finals, while events 400 meters and longer were held with preliminaries and finals.  Semifinals featured sixteen swimmers in two heats; the finals included eight swimmers in a single heat.  Preliminaries were seeded with ten lanes.  Event order, which mimicked that of the 2016 Olympics, with the exception of the Olympic relay events, was:

U.S. Olympic Team
The following swimmers qualified to compete at the 2016 Summer Olympics (for pool events):

Men
Nathan Adrian, Gunnar Bentz, Jack Conger, Kevin Cordes, Caeleb Dressel, Conor Dwyer, Anthony Ervin, Jimmy Feigen, Townley Haas, Ryan Held, Connor Jaeger, Chase Kalisz, Jay Litherland, Ryan Lochte, Cody Miller, Ryan Murphy, Jacob Pebley, Michael Phelps, Blake Pieroni, David Plummer, Josh Prenot, Tom Shields, Clark Smith, and Jordan Wilimovsky.

Sources:

Women
Cammile Adams, Kathleen Baker, Elizabeth Beisel, Maya DiRado, Hali Flickinger, Missy Franklin, Molly Hannis, Lilly King, Katie Ledecky, Simone Manuel, Melanie Margalis, Katie Meili, Lia Neal, Cierra Runge, Allison Schmitt, Leah Smith, Olivia Smoliga, Dana Vollmer, Amanda Weir, Abbey Weitzeil, and Kelsi Worrell.

Source:

Results 
Key:

Men's events

Women's events

References

External links 

Swimming Olympic trials
Olympic Trails swimming
United States
Sports competitions in Omaha, Nebraska
United States
United States Summer Olympics Trials